Zhou Zhuoru (born September 14, 1988) is an artistic gymnast from Fushun, Liaoning, China.

Zhou was an alternate on the Chinese women's gymnastics team at the 2004 Summer Olympics. Two years later, she competed at the 2006 World Artistic Gymnastics Championships in Aarhus, Denmark, where China won the gold medal in the team event. Zhou contributed routines on vault and uneven bars, scoring 14.450 and 15.150, respectively. She also participated in the all-around final, finishing 12th with a combined score of 58.575.

Floor music
2005–06: "Retro" by Vanessa Mae
2006–09: "Politics at Work" and "Battle Preparation" from The Myth

References

External links
 
 

1988 births
Living people
Chinese female artistic gymnasts
Asian Games medalists in gymnastics
Asian Games gold medalists for China
Asian Games silver medalists for China
Gymnasts at the 2006 Asian Games
Medalists at the 2006 Asian Games
Universiade medalists in gymnastics
Universiade gold medalists for China
Universiade silver medalists for China
Medalists at the World Artistic Gymnastics Championships
Gymnasts from Liaoning
People from Fushun
Medalists at the 2009 Summer Universiade
Medalists at the 2007 Summer Universiade
21st-century Chinese women